Vasily Fyodorovich Borisov (12 December 1922 – 21 August 2003) was a Soviet rifle shooter. He competed at the 1956 and 1960 Olympics in five individual events and won a gold, a silver and a bronze medal. Between 1954 and 1966 Borisov won 22 medals at the world championships. At the 1954 World Championships, he and his teammate Anatoli Bogdanov won 13 medals each, cleansweeping most rifle events. 

After he retired from competitions, Borisov worked as a coach. He lived in Moscow, on Mira Avenue. Borisov died in Moscow on 21 August 2003, at the age of 80.

References

External links

1922 births
2003 deaths
Communist Party of the Soviet Union members
Russian State University of Physical Education, Sport, Youth and Tourism alumni
ISSF rifle shooters
Olympic shooters of the Soviet Union
Shooters at the 1956 Summer Olympics
Shooters at the 1960 Summer Olympics
Honoured Masters of Sport of the USSR
Recipients of the Order of the Red Banner of Labour
Olympic gold medalists for the Soviet Union
Olympic silver medalists for the Soviet Union
Olympic bronze medalists for the Soviet Union
Olympic medalists in shooting
Medalists at the 1956 Summer Olympics
Medalists at the 1960 Summer Olympics
Russian male sport shooters
Soviet male sport shooters